Phire CMS (pronounced "fire") is an open source content management system and publishing platform for managing the content of websites and web applications. Phire CMS is licensed under the new BSD license, is written using the MySQL database and the PHP programming language.

History 
The Phire CMS project started in 2009 by developer Nick Sagona and was born out of a collection of custom-built content management systems that had been developed by Nick to meet specific client needs. The project started under the code name Phoenix, but was changed to Phire before the official release. Phire is heavily influenced by what has become a standard set of expected features available in other CMS projects, but offers a handful of additional features built directly into the application, such as multiple site management and mobile access and presentation.

The core of the Phire CMS version 1 branch is specifically built on top of the object-oriented PHP library, Moc10 PHP Library, and uses the JavaScript library, Jax JavaScript Library, to enhance the overall user interface and user experience.

Releases 
Official coding and development of Phire began in the beginning of January, 2010. Beta-testing occurred between August, 2010 and October 2010, and the official release of the stable version 1.0 was released on November 1, 2010. An update to Phire, v1.0.1, was released on November 22, 2010, addressing security and adding a few small upgrades. Phire CMS v1.1 was released on January 9, 2011, and contains a host of new features and updates, including an easier installation process and support for 12 languages.

Although the name "Phire" has no direct connection, the naming convention for the project code names is influenced by the Marvel Universe, particularly the X-Men set of characters. The project code names do not always have to relate to some element of fire or flame. The "Ph" in Phire itself is more of a play on the "PH" of PHP, the programming language in which the project is written.

Future release 
Development for Phire CMS v 2.0 was announced on April 4, 2012, and is currently underway. It will utilize the next generation of the PHP framework that it was built on, the Pop PHP Framework, moving on from the Moc10 PHP Library, which is now at its end of life. While the new version will most likely break backward compatibility and require PHP 5.3 or greater, a good many robust features will be built in and improved upon as directed from community input and feedback.

Features 
Phire CMS has many features that are built in, but it also provides a platform for the application to be extended via its API. Phire also takes a more aggressive stance on its support of PHP, as it requires PHP 5.2.6 or above and is fully compatible with PHP 5.3. Phire does not support PHP 4. It also requires MySQL 5.0 or above.

 Installs on Linux, Unix, Windows or Mac OS based servers
 Uses Apache, Microsoft IIS or any web server platform that supports URL rewrites
 Language support for 12 languages
 Multiple site management is built-in; system administrators can assign different users to different sites.
 Multiple user access levels
 Open authoring—system administrators can allow or disallow users to work on others' content.
 SEO-friendly URLs and meta-content management
 Site content syndication feed
 Mobile system access and alternate mobile presentation for content is built-in
 Built-in support for popular WYSIWYG editors
 Robust file and image settings, including image sizing and batch image uploads
 Extensive site member control, including registration, login and member session management
 Spam filter and CAPTCHA built-in for site input interactions
 Page caching for performance
 Built-in sections to group and order content and assets together for display as needed; sections can be nested as well.
 Built-in external feed integration
 Integration and support for the popular video engine sites (YouTube, Vimeo and Viddler)
 Support for extensions—themes to quickly apply different designs and plugins to extend the application's overall functionality.

Vulnerabilities 
A handful of security issues were discovered in the first official release of Phire CMS. According to Secunia, Phire CMS v1.0 had 25 scripts with a maximum rating of "Less Critical" in the areas of cross-site scripting and manipulation of data. A total of 36 scripts were patched for security for the Phire CMS v1.0.1 release.

References

External links 
 

Blog software
Content management systems
Free content management systems
Free software programmed in PHP
Website management